Raül Tortosa is a Spanish actor and director born in Terrassa (Barcelona). He is also the vocalist of the pop-rock band Una Hora Más.

In 2016 he portrayed a Tyrell Captain in the HBO series Game of Thrones in Season 6. He won the Best Actor Award in the 16th edition of the Venice Shorts Film Festival 2021  in California (USA) for Shadowed.

Filmography

Films 
 Sant Martí by David C. Ruiz and Albert València (2017)
 100 metros by Marcel Barrena  (2016)
 Waratah: Pandemonium by Felix D'Ax and Hector Morgan (2016)
 Cromosoma Cinco by Maria Ripoll (2012)
 Cuatro Estaciones by Marcel Barrena (2010)
 Salvador (Puig Antich) by Manuel Huerga (2006)

Television 
Enemy of the people (2022)
Los Herederos de la Tierra (2022)
El secreto de Puente Viejo (2017)
Queens (2017)
Game of Thrones (2016)
Acacias 38 (2016)
El Crac (2014)
La Riera (2014)
El Cor de la Ciutat (2006–2009)
Llegendes Urbanes (2008)
Lalola (2008)
De Llibres (2006)
Pecats Capitals (2005)

Shortfilms 
 A Little Death (Maria Pawlikowska, 2021).
 Shadowed (Juliette Hagopian, 2021).
 Atropos (Carlos Cobos and Alejandro Arenas, 2019).
 Lia (Marta Viña, 2017).
 Una tarde con Bolaño (Miquel Casals, 2016).
 Lina (Nur Casadevall, 2015).
 L'Altre Costat (Joaquim Bundó, 2015).
 Petra (Ginebra Bricollé and Alejandra García Herrero, 2015).
 Encadenados (Albert Sánchez, 2014).
 400KM (Miquel Casals, 2014).
 Fundido a negro (Miquel Casals, 2011).
 Persuasió (Miquel Casals, 2009).
 En el Mundo de Hopper (Maria Verdú, 2009).
 Saps res de vàters? (Maria Verdú, 2009).
 Recuerdos anónimos (Eduard Riu, 2009).
 Larga distancia (Gemma Ferraté, 2009).
 Visceral (2008).
 Primo (Mikel Gurrea, 2007).
 Lazy (Elisenda Granero, 2007).
 Juego de niños (Laura Cladelles, 2006).
 A gay’s life (Luís Fabra, 2006).
 Troy (Miki Loma, 2006).
 Blanco roto (Nerea Lebrero, 2006).
 C-80 (Eduard Soriano, 2006).
 Costuras (Iván Tomás Félez, 2006).
 Lágrimas de Cocodrilo (Carles Curt, 2005).
 El baile del cangrejo (Lorena Hernández, 2006).
 Zulo (Albert Vall, 2004).
 15x20 (Ferran Collado, 2004).
 La quinta (Patricia Esteban, Laia Gómez, 2004).
 Las llaves de Disneylandia (Breixo Corral, 2004).
 45 Frames (Gustavo Romero, 2004).
 Absurdo (Tomás Suárez, 2004).

Theatre (as an actor) 
Kalumba (2022)
Nyotaimori (2021)
El Brindis (2019-2022)
El Millor per als Nostres Fills (2019)
Separacions (2019)
Gustafsson R60 (2019)
Sota la Catifa (2017)
Per tu, m'enamoraria (2017)
El Dramaturgo (2016)
A Voz Ahogada, un homenaje a Miguel Hernández (2016)
La Estuardo (2016)
Más Retales (2016)
Retales (2014-2015)
Hoy Me Voy Con Bla Bla Car (2014)
Suite 315 (2014)
Totes Les Parelles Ho Fan (2013)
Tu Digues Que l'Estimes (2012-2014)
Una mirada inocente (2003)

Theatre (as a director) 
 Ximpanzé (2021)
 Un Home Sol (2021)
 Here Comes Your Man (2019)

Theatre (as assistant director) 
 Nyotaimori (2021-2022) 
 Tonta (2020-2021)

Music (Una Hora Más)

Una Hora Más albums 
Tiempo de Locos (2012)

Una Hora Más videoclips 
Tiempo de Locos (2014)
Si Vuelves (2013)

References

External links 
 
 
 Videoclip "Si Vuelves"
 Interview in Radio Sant Cugat

Living people
Year of birth missing (living people)
Male actors from Barcelona
Spanish male film actors
Spanish male television actors
Spanish male stage actors